The United States of Venezuela was the official name of Venezuela, adopted in its 1864 constitution under the Juan Crisóstomo Falcón government. This remained the official name until 1953, when the constitution of that year renamed it the Republic of Venezuela. In 1999 under newly elected president Hugo Chavez and his modification to the Constitution, Venezuela's official name became the Bolivarian Republic of Venezuela.

Flag 

The United States of Venezuela used three official flags in its time:

History

Original name 

The 1858 constitution gave it the official name  ("Republic of Venezuela"). After the Liberal Party won power in the Federal War it called for a constitutional convention, to establish the constitution on federal principles. On 28 March 1864, members of the convention met in Caracas to sign it. President Falcón ordered its publication and circulation on 13 April, and on 22 April it was finally ratified by the Ministers of the Interior and Justice, Finance, Development, and War and Sea.

Change of name 

The next constitution, of 1961, confirmed the new name. Venezuela is currently, under the new Constitution of 1999, officially known as the Bolivarian Republic of Venezuela,

Geography

Borders 

The 1864 constitution established the borders of the United States of Venezuela to be the same of those of the 1810 Captaincy General of Venezuela. This statement has been preserved throughout subsequent constitutions.

Because of long-running territorial dispute between the United States of Venezuela and the United Kingdom over Guayana Esequiba several countries called for an international court of justice to settle the matter, which was held in Paris in 1899, and ruled in the UK's favour. From 1900 to 1905, Venezuela participated in the Joint Committee of the British-Venezuelan Border for the final demarcation between the two countries, which was signed in September 1907. In 1932, Juan Vicente Gómez agreed a point on the summit of Mount Roraima as the three-way boundary between Brazil, British Guiana and Venezuela.

Subdivisions

1864 

The 1864 constitution gave these former provinces the status as states:

 Apure
 Aragua
 Barcelona
 Barinas
 Barquisimeto
 Carabobo
 Caracas
 Cojedes
 Coro
 Sucre (Cumaná)
 Guárico
 Bolívar (Guayana)
 Nueva Esparta (Margarita Island)
 Monagas (Maturín)
 Mérida
 Portuguesa
 Táchira
 Trujillo
 Yaracuy
 Zulia (Maracaibo)

It was stated that the boundaries would remain as in 1856.

1881 
The 1881 constitution merged the states created in 1864 into eight, larger states:

 : comprising Barcelona, Cumaná and Maturín.
 Guzmán Blanco: comprising Bolívar, Guzmán Blanco (Aragua), Guárico and Nueva Esparta.
 Carabobo: comprising Carabobo and Nirgua.
 Sur de Occidente: comprising Cojedes, Portuguesa and Zamora (Barinas).
 Norte de Occidente: comprising Barquisimeto and Yaracuy, except for Nirgua.
 Los Andes: comprising Guzmán (Mérida), Trujillo and Táchira.
 Bolívar: comprising Guayana and Apure.
 Falcón Zulia: comprising Zulia and Coro.

1891 
The 1891 constitution established new state boundaries:

 Bermúdez: comprising Barcelona, Cumaná and Maturín.
 Miranda: comprising Bolívar, Guzmán Blanco, Guárico and Nueva Esparta.
 Carabobo: comprising Carabobo and Nirgua.
 Zamora: comprising Cojedes, Portuguesa and Zamora.
 Lara: comprising Barquisimeto and Yaracuy, but excluding the Nirgua department.
 Los Andes: comprising Guzmán, Trujillo and Táchira.
 Bolívar: comprising Guayana and Apure.
 Zulia: unitary state.
 Falcón: unitary state.

1901 
The 1901 constitution established new divisions of the states:

 Apure
 Aragua
 Bolívar (previously Guayana)
 Barcelona
 Carabobo
 Cojedes
 Falcón (previously Coro)
 Guárico
 Lara (previously Barquisimeto)
 Mérida
 Miranda (previously Caracas)
 Maturín
 Sucre (previously Cumaná)
 Nueva Esparta (previously Margarita)
 Portuguesa
 Táchira
 Trujillo
 Yaracuy
 Zamora (previously Barinas)
 Zulia (previously Maracaibo)

1904 
New division of territory:

 Aragua
 Bermúdez
 Bolívar
 Carabobo
 Falcón
 Guárico
 Lara
 Mérida
 Miranda
 Táchira
 Trujillo
 Zamora
 Zulia

1909 
Another division of territory, and new names for some of the states:

 Distrito Federal
 Anzoátegui
 Apure
 Aragua
 Bolívar
 Carabobo
 Cojedes
 Falcón
 Guárico
 Lara
 Mérida
 Miranda
 Monagas
 Nueva Esparta
 Portuguesa
 Sucre
 Táchira
 Trujillo
 Yaracuy
 Zamora
 Zulia
 Federal territories: Amazonas and Delta Amacuro

1925 
Creation of the Federal Dependencies of Venezuela, shore islands belonging to Venezuela in the Caribbean Sea and Gulf of Venezuela.

However, Margarita Island ( or ) became part of the State of Nueva Esparta.

1928 
Coche Island was incorporated into the State of Nueva Esparta.

Minor changes under Juan V. Gòmez.

1947 
The state of Zamora was renamed to Barinas and the island of Cubagua was incorporated into Nueva Esparta.

Politics and government

Constitutions 
After the 1864 Constitution of the United States of Venezuela, there were several revisions under different governments.

These were in 1874, 1881, 1891, 1893–94, 1901, 1909, 1914, 1922, 1925, 1928, 1929, 1931, 1936, 1945.

After a Decree of the Revolutionary Government, the constitution was revised further in 1947 and 1953.

Presidents

References 

History of Venezuela
19th century in Venezuela
20th century in Venezuela
1864 establishments in South America
1953 disestablishments in South America
States and territories disestablished in 1953
States and territories established in 1864